Mgahinga Gorilla National Park is a national park in southwestern Uganda.

Geography
Mgahinga Gorilla National Park is located in the Virunga Mountains and encompasses three inactive volcanoes, namely Mount Muhabura, Mount Gahinga, and Mount Sabyinyo. It is contiguous with Rwanda's Volcanoes National Park and the southern sector of Virunga National Park in the Democratic Republic of the Congo.

Climate 
The area experiences two wet rainy seasons: February to May; and September to December.

Biodiversity

The national park encompasses bamboo forest, Albertine Rift montane forests, Ruwenzori-Virunga montane moorlands with tree heath, and an alpine zone at higher altitudes.

Wildlife 
Primates present in the national park include mountain gorilla (Gorilla beringei beringei) and golden monkey (Cercopithecus kandti). The iconic mountain gorillas (around 30 individuals split between one habituated and two unhabituated groups) and the charismatic golden monkey ( an Albertine Rift Endemic whose range is now restricted to the Virungas and one other forest in Rwanda). The checklist of 76 mammal species includes black-and-white colobus, leopard, elephant, giant forest hog, bushpig, buffalo, bushbuck, black-fronted duiker, and several varieties of rodents, bats and small predators.

Of the Albertine Rift's endemic birds, the following were recorded in the national park during surveys in 2004: handsome spurfowl, dusky crimson-wing, red-throated alethe, Kivu ground thrush, Rwenzori turaco, Rwenzori batis, Rwenzori double-collared sunbird, collared apalis, mountain masked apalis, Archer's ground robin, stripe-breasted tit, blue-headed sunbird, regal sunbird, strange weaver, montane nightjar, red-faced woodland warbler and Grauer's swamp warbler.

Tourism 
Mgahinga Gorilla National Park is Uganda’s smallest national park, receiving one of the fewest annual visitor numbers of any national park in Uganda. Popular tourist activities include mountain gorilla tracking, golden monkey tracking, volcano hiking, nature walks including to the gorge platform, bird watching and meeting the Batwa community. Tourists visiting Mgahinga Gorilla National Park make a 9 hours drive from Kampala to reach the park. The park is also connected by daily domestic flights from Entebbe International Airport and on to Kihihi Airstrip, which land at Kisoro Airport.

History
Mgahinga Gorilla National Park was established in 1991 in an area that used to be a game reserve between the 1930s and 1950, but was partly converted to crop fields in lower altitudes. Biological surveys were initiated in 1989, wire traps destroyed, rangers trained and trees planted. Settlers were relocated to areas outside the national park's borders in the early 1990s.

In November 2013, the M23 Movement, a Congolese rebel group, surrendered in the park after being defeated by the Congolese Army in the M23 rebellion.

See also
 List of birds of Uganda

References

External links

 

National parks of Uganda
Kisoro District
Virunga Mountains
Forests of Uganda
Important Bird Areas of Uganda
Protected areas established in 1991
1991 establishments in Uganda
Albertine Rift montane forests